Harrya is a fungal genus in the family Boletaceae. It was circumscribed in 2012 to contain the species Harrya atriceps and the type Harrya chromapes.

The genus name of Harrya is in honour of Harry Delbert Thiers (1919–2000), who was an American mycologist who studied and named many fungi native to North America, particularly California.

Species
As accepted by Species Fungorum;
 Harrya alpina 
 Harrya atriceps 
 Harrya atrogrisea 
 Harrya chromipes 
 Harrya moniliformis 
 Harrya subalpina

References

External links

Boletaceae
Boletales genera